The Autobiography of a Super-Tramp  is an autobiography published in 1908 by the Welsh poet and writer W. H. Davies (1871–1940). A large part of the book's subject matter describes the way of life of the tramp in the United Kingdom, Canada and the United States in the final decade of the 19th century.

Publication history
George Bernard Shaw had become interested in Davies, a literary unknown at the time, and had agreed to write a preface for the book, largely through the efforts of his wife Charlotte. It was only because of Shaw that Davies' contract with the publishers was re-written to allow the author to retain the serial rights, all rights after three years, royalties of fifteen per cent of selling price and a non-returnable advance of £25 (equivalent to £). Davies was also to be given a say on the style of all illustrations, advertisement layouts and cover designs. The original publisher, Duckworth and Sons, refused to accept these demands and so the book was placed instead with Fifield. Shaw was also instrumental in keeping the unusual title of the book, of which Davies himself was unsure, and which later proved to be controversial with some reviewers.

The book was the third published by Davies, having been preceded by The Soul's Destroyer (1905) and New Poems (1907). The 1920 edition of the book concludes with five poems selected by Davies from The Soul's Destroyer.

The book was written in the space of six weeks, "a great achievement for a first book by a man with the minimum of education."

In April 2013 Parthian Books published a new edition of the novel featuring Bernard Shaw's original introduction; it is part of the Library of Wales series, a collection of classic writing from Wales in the English language, a joint initiative of the Welsh Assembly Government and a Welsh Books Council.

Background and synopsis
Following a delinquent childhood and youth, Davies renounced his home and his apprenticeship with a frame maker. At the age of twenty-two, having borrowed money from the executor of his grandmother’s estate, he sailed to America. This was the first of more than a dozen Atlantic crossings, often made by working his passage aboard a cattle boat. Between 1893 and 1899 Davies travelled the highways and railroads, tutored by hardened men of the road. He took advantage of the corrupt system of "boodle jails" in order to pass the winter in Michigan, staying in a series of different jails. These were jails in which a tramp could make an illicit arrangement with a law enforcement officer to stay in the jail without being an actual prisoner. Here, with his fellow tramps, Davies would enjoy the relative comfort of "card-playing, singing, smoking, reading, relating experiences and occasionally taking exercise or going out for a walk." Regular work was never an option and Davies subsisted largely by begging. After crossing the Atlantic from Britain to Canada at the time of the Klondike Gold Rush, Davies fell while hopping a train. His foot was crushed and his leg had to be amputated below the knee. He later wrote of the effect the accident had on his life: "All the wildness had been taken out of me and my adventures after this were not of my own seeking."

The book was praised by Osbert Sitwell for its "primitive splendour and directness", while Bernard Shaw himself commended the prose to "literary experts for its style alone", describing Davies as "the incorrigible Supertramp who wrote this amazing book."

Adaptations
 In 1948 the BBC Home Service (now BBC Radio 4) recorded a potted version of the book over fifteen consecutive Sundays, beginning on 4 April. It was narrated by Welsh poet Dylan Thomas.

In popular culture
On the official website of the British progressive rock band Supertramp, reviewer P. Robichaud credits Davies' book for the origin of the band's name.

Chris McCandless renamed himself "Alexander Supertramp" when he began his journey in the US. After his death, his life inspired the 1996 biography Into The Wild and the 2007 film of the same name.

References

External links
 The Autobiography of a Super-Tramp at Internet Archive and Google Books (scanned books original editions multiple formats)
 The Autobiography of a Super-Tramp at MobileRead.com - well-formatted free versions for download.
 The Autobiography of a Super-Tramp (HTML)
 

1908 non-fiction books
Alfred A. Knopf books
British autobiographical novels
Anglo-Welsh novels